List of Suzuki vehicles cover vehicles produced by Suzuki in past and present.

Automobiles

Motorcycles 

Suzuki